The 7th Annual Latin American Music Awards were held at the Michelob Ultra Arena in Las Vegas, Nevada. They were broadcast live on Telemundo. Bad Bunny lead the nominations with ten nods, while Karol G was the top winner, with ten nods.

Performers

Nicki Nicole was announced as a performer, but hours before the ceremony, she had to cancel her presentation due to weather conditions that prevented the plane from traveling

Winners and nominees 
The nominations were announced on March 3, 2022.

Multiple nominations and awards

Special Honor

Legend Award: Lupita D’Alessio
Extraordinary Evolution Award: Christian Nodal

References

External links 

 Official account on Facebook

2022 music awards
2022 in Latin music
2022 in Nevada